Kwaku Boateng (c. 1926 – 1 May 2006) was a Ghanaian politician and barrister who was a state minister in the First Republic.

Early life and education
Boateng was born to Opanin Acheampong and Madam Anima Acheampong of Old Tafo in the Akyem Abuakwa. He started schooling at the Old Tafo Primary School and continued at the Begoro Senior School for his middle school education. He entered Mfantsipim School, Cape Coast in 1941 and was there until 1944 when he was transferred to the Presbyterian Secondary School at Odumase Krobo where he received his Cambridge School Certificate. He proceeded to Fourah Bay College, Freetown, Sierra Leone in 1948 but left in 1949 and enrolled at King's College London University. He graduated in 1954 obtaining his Bachelor of Laws Degree and was called to the English Bar at Gray's Inn in 1955. He was called to the Ghana Bar later that year and subsequently entered La Chambers as a junior practitioner. He began his own private practice in 1956 and remained in private practice until December that year when he was elected Member of Parliament for the Tafo constituency.

Politics
Kwaku Boateng was a member of the Convention People's Party and served in various capacities in the Nkrumah government.
He was Information Minister and in 1961, became Interior Minister. He was Education Minister under Kwame Nkrumah from May 1964.

Exile
After the 24 February 1966 coup d'état by the National Liberation Council, he along with other members of the government went into exile. He went to the United Kingdom with his family.

Other activities
While Minister of Education, He opened the Bible House, headquarters of the Bible Society of Ghana on behalf of Kwame Nkrumah in 1965. He was a trustee of the Bible Society until his death. Towards the end of his political career, Boateng became an evangelist.

Family
Paul Boateng, a British Labour politician, who was the Member of Parliament for Brent South from 1987 to 2005, is his son. Kwaku Boateng's wife was Mrs. Eleanor Boateng who was Scottish. His brothers are Andrew Boateng, of New York, and Francis Boateng, Lieutenant of the Los Angeles Police Department (in the Commercial Crimes Division). In the early 1950s, Kwaku Boateng had an affair with a young woman, bearing him a son Isaac Boateng. Kwaku Boateng and J. B. Danquah were related by marriage.

Death
Kwaku Boateng died on 1 May 2006 at Paul's home in Cape Town, South Africa during Paul's stint as High Commissioner to South Africa. He was 80 years old.

References

See also
Nkrumah government
Convention People's Party

1920s births
2006 deaths
20th-century Ghanaian lawyers
Information ministers of Ghana
Interior ministers of Ghana
Education ministers of Ghana
Ghanaian MPs 1956–1965
Convention People's Party (Ghana) politicians
Year of birth uncertain
Presbyterian Boys' Senior High School alumni